Jock Allan (4 June 1905 - 29 December 1958) was a Scotland international rugby union player. He was the first married man to play for the Scotland side.

Rugby Union career

Amateur career
Allan played for Melrose.

He was in the Melrose 7s side that won the Melrose Sevens in 1931.

Provincial career
He played in the South of Scotland District versus North of Scotland District match of 1931.

By 1933 he was dropped by the South of Scotland District side; their team that season were underdogs to beat the North of Scotland District side.

International career
He was capped 17 times for Scotland from 1927 to 1934.

He made headlines in his cap against Ireland on 24 February 1934 - he was the first married man to play for Scotland.

References

1905 births
1958 deaths
Melrose RFC players
Rugby union players from Melrose, Scottish Borders
Scotland international rugby union players
Scottish rugby union players
South of Scotland District (rugby union) players
Rugby union props